Meinrad Schütter (21 September 1910 – 12 January 2006) was a Swiss composer. He studied with Willy Burkhard during World War II and with Paul Hindemith from 1950 to 1954.

He wrote choral music, two masses, the opera Medea, ballet music, a symphony and other orchestral works, many songs with piano or instrumental accompaniment, piano music, chamber music and one piano concerto.

External links
Meinrad Schütter website
Meinrad Schütter at Musinfo

1910 births
2006 deaths
20th-century classical composers
Swiss male classical composers
Male opera composers
Swiss classical composers
Swiss opera composers
20th-century male musicians
20th-century Swiss composers